Trimethyllysine dioxygenase, mitochondrial is an enzyme that in humans is encoded by the TMLHE gene in chromosome X. Mutations in the TMLHE gene resulting in carnitine biosynthesis disruption have been associated with autism symptoms.

Structure 

The TMHLE gene is located at the extreme end of the Xq28 region with high genomic instability, and encodes a protein trimethyllysine dioxygenase, a, Fe2+ and 2-oxoglytarate dependent non-heme-ferrous iron hydrolase localized to the mitochondrial matrix.

Function 
The trimethyllysine dioxygenase enzyme catalyzes the first step in the carnitine biosynthesis pathway, which is part of amine biosynthesis. Carnitine is a molecule that play an essential role in the transport of activated fatty acids across the inner mitochondrial membrane where they are metabolized. The encoded protein converts trimethyllysine into hydroxytrimethyllysine with the reaction (EC 1.14.11.8):

N6,N6,N(6)-trimethyl-L-lysine + 2-oxoglutarate + O2 = 3-hydroxy-N6,N6,N(6)-trimethyl-L-lysine + succinate + CO2.

and requires iron and L-ascorbate as co-factors.

Clinical significance 

Mutations in the TMLHE gene cause epsilon-trimethyllysine hydroxylase deficiency (TMLHED), an inborn error of metabolism in carnitine biosynthesis, which may increase the risks of developing neurodevelopmental disorders, autism-related behaviors, and autism spectrum disorders.

Interactions 
TMLHE has been shown to have 14 binary protein-protein interactions including 12 co-complex interactions. TMLHE appears to interact with SUGCT.

References

Further reading